The 2005 season in the Latvian Higher League, named Virslīga, was the 15th domestic football (soccer) competition since the Baltic nation gained independence from the Soviet Union on 6 September 1991. Eight teams competed in this edition, with FK Liepājas Metalurgs claiming the title.

Final table

Match table

Relegation play-offs

Top scorers

Awards

References

Latvian Higher League seasons
1
Latvia
Latvia